Jose Mari Lim Chan (born March 11, 1945) is a Filipino singer, TV host, songwriter and businessman in the sugar industry. Regarded as one of the pillars and icons of Original Pilpino Music (OPM). He is currently chairman and CEO of Binalbagan Isabela Sugar Company, Inc. (BISCOM) in Negros Occidental and A. Chan Sugar Corporation. He is also the chairman and president of Signature Music, Inc. Awarded in 1974 as one of the Ten Outstanding Young Men of the Philippines. He received a Lifetime Achievement Awards from the Philippine Association of the Recording Industry and The Metro Pop Foundation. Recipient of the first ever ABS-CBN "ELITE Platinum Award" in 2005 and a recipient of the 2006 Dr. Jose P. Rizal Award For Excellence.

Early life
Jose Mari Lim Chan was born on March 11, 1945, in Iloilo City and was the first-born child of Antonio Chan and Florencia Lim. His father was an immigrant from Fujian, China who came to the Philippines at age 13 and started a sugar trading company in Bacolod. Chan's mother was the only child of a Chinese-Filipino couple.

Chan was exposed to music in his childhood with his maternal grandmother from Cebu often playing music at their house and his mother being a pianist. He was also accompanied by the family's house helper to participate in the radio program Children's Hour on DYRI where children performed the piano, sang, and recited poetry. At school he was often selected to perform in school programs. Paul Anka and Neil Sedaka are among the songwriters which served as his inspiration in his childhood. Chan wrote his first song at age 13. Chan's father was supportive of his involvement in Children's Hour but was reluctant of supporting his music career by the time he was age 14 or 15 when he began composing songs. His father was concerned their Chinese background would put Chan at a disadvantage in the music industry and encouraged him to relegate his music pursuits as a hobby and to pursue a business career instead. When Chan reminded the older gentleman that he did have a flair for composing, he was told that that particular field "would not be enough to support a family." It was then he realized the wisdom and concern voiced by his parent.

Chan attended the Ateneo de Manila University where he met fellow musician Ramon Jacinto of RJ & the Riots. He graduated with a Bachelor of Arts Degree in Economics in 1967.

Musical career
Chan first appeared on the local scene as a guest on Pilita Corrales's program An Evening with Pilita in 1965. The next year, he became the host and singer of a television show called 9 Teeners of ABS-CBN 3 (now ABS-CBN 2) which aired on weekdays and Saturday in 1966. Since he was a junior student at that time at Ateneo and he was being encouraged to become a businessman, his father only consented his involvement if he was not paid salary for the stint. His first single "Afterglow" was released in 1967. He would release his first album two years later. after he was approached by an independent record producer.

His first long playing album Deep in My Heart was issued in 1969. In 1973, he represented the Philippines in the World Popular Song Festival in Tokyo where his song "Can We Just Stop And Talk Awhile" went into the final entries. For more or less than four years from 1970 to 1974, Jose Mari Chan was able to compose more than 20 songs for movies and earned him different recognitions and nominations at the Filipino Academy of Movie Arts and Sciences Awards (FAMAS Awards). He also wrote several well-loved commercial jingles, among which are the Philippine Airlines' "Love at Thirty Thousand Feet", the Knorr Chinese Soup jingle, and the Alaska Milk jingle. Between 1974 and 1975 he was the Star of a series of Television Network Specials spotlighting his words and music.

In 1975, he moved to the United States to run a branch office of their family's sugar business and remained there for 11 years, continuously composing songs as well.  Some of which were recorded by foreign artists. In 1986, he returned to the Philippines and made a comeback to the music industry with the release of his album A Golden Collection, a compilation of his hits along with a brand new composition "Tell Me Your Name" which re-introduced him to a younger audience. The album was released by Universal Records.

On February 14, 1988, Chan performed at the Maynila restaurant within the Manila Hotel as a guest act for Joey Albert's Valentine's Day dinner concert "Here's to Love", his first live performance in years.

In 1989, he released his album Constant Change. It was named Album of the Year by the Awit Awards, the local equivalent of the American Grammy Awards and reached the Diamond Record in terms of sales. The Diamond Award is given to albums or singles selling ten million units or more. It was also sold in other Asian countries such as Malaysia, Singapore and Indonesia.

In 1990, his Christmas album, Christmas in Our Hearts was released. It reached triple platinum status that same year, eventually earning the Double Diamond Record Award in 1995, for selling over 20 million units. The significant popularity of his iconic Christmas songs and the album during the holiday season annually earned him the title "Father of Philippine Christmas Music".

In 1994, he released his eighth album, Thank You Love, where he has another song "Is She Thinking About Me" with Christine Bersola-Babao and another Christmas song, "Christmas Past". His 2001 album A Heart's Journey won Album of the year in the Awit Awards. In 2005, he composed "We're All Just One" as the theme song of the 2005 Southeast Asian Games. In 2007, he released his 12th album Love Letters and Other Souvenirs.

In 2009, Chan was inducted to the Philippines Eastwood City Walk Of Fame.

In 2010, Chan was awarded as MYX Magna Award Winner in the MYX Music Awards 2010 for awarding as a contribution for being a singer, composer and also a businessman & TV host.

In 2011, he released his 13th full-length album, The Manhattan Connection: The Songs of Jose Mari Chan. The album, which was produced by Janis Siegel of The Manhattan Transfer. The songs were reimagined by music producer Yaron Gershovsky.

In 2012, he released his 14th over-all album Going Home to Christmas. It was his second Christmas album after 22 years since Christmas In Our Hearts was released in 1990.

Due to Chan's association to Christmas music in the Philippines, he has been a frequent subject of internet memes during the Christmas season in the country which traditionally starts in September. Because of his popularity during these seasons, he was known as the "King of Filipino Christmas Carols"

Business career
He is the chairman and chief executive officer of Binalbagan-Isabela Sugar Company Inc. (BISCOM) and A. Chan Sugar Corporation as of 2018.
Upon encouragement of his father, Chan became involved in the family business in 1967 right after he graduated from Ateneo. He later inherited the business from his father. Chan has described his business career as his second priority behind his family affairs and ahead of his music career. In 1975, he had to move to the United States in relation to his family's sugar business and returned to the Philippines in 1986.

Personal life
He is married to Mary Ann Ansaldo and has five children, who have inherited their musical talent from him. His daughter, Liza, has been featured in several duets with him. His sons Joe & Mike Chan formed a musical duo and released their debut album in 2019 under Star Music. Although currently based in and residing primarily in Metro Manila with his family, Chan maintains his homes in Iloilo and Cebu.

Chan is a devout Roman Catholic.

Awards

The Bacolod city government in 2018 named him as their adopted son by the Bacolod City Council, and as their honorary mayor during the administration of Mayor Evelio Leonardia for his role in the growth of the Bacolod's sugar industry.

Discography

Albums
Deep in My Heart (1969)
Can We Just Stop and Talk Awhile (1973) - Tokyo World Popular Song Festival
Afterthoughts (1974)
Here and Now (1975)
A Golden Collection (1985)
Constant Change (1989) - 2× Diamond
Christmas in Our Hearts (1990) - 2× Diamond
Thank You, Love (1994)
Strictly Commercial: The Jingles Collection (1997)
Souvenirs (1998)
A Heart's Journey (2001) - Awit Awards, Album of the Year
Love Letters and Other Souvenirs (2007)
The Manhattan Connection (2011)
Going Home to Christmas (2012)
Christmas in Our Hearts: 25th Anniversary Edition (2015)

Songs
"Afterglow"/"Pines" (1967)
"Run Jimmy Run"
"I Only Live to Love You"/"Night Time"
"Love Me as Though There Were No Tomorrow"
"High and Mighty"/"Seventh Dawn" (accompanied by the Sandpipers)
"This Guy's in Love with You"
"Deep in My Heart"/"Leave You" (1969)
"Walk on Girl"
"Love Is for the Two of Us" (with Pilar Pilapil)
"Can We Just Stop and Talk Awhile"/"From Day to Day" (1973)
"Refrain"/"Times We're In" (1973)
"What Is a Sweetheart" (1976)
"A Love to Last a Lifetime"/"A Love Song" (1978)
"Tell Me Your Name"/"One of Many" (1985)
"Beautiful Girl" (1989) (also covered by Martin Nievera, Christian Bautista, Parokya Ni Edgar & Ben&Ben)
"Can't We Start Over Again" (1989)
"A Perfect Christmas" (1990) (also covered by Various OPM Artists Feat. Ben&Ben, December Avenue, Moira Dela Torre & More)
"Christmas in Our Hearts" (1990) (also covered by American Pop Acapella Vocal Group, Pentatonix Feat. Lea Salonga in 2022)
"A Whole New World" (duet with Lea Salonga) - as part for Philippine soundtrack release of Disney's Aladdin (1992)
"Please Be Careful with My Heart" (1989) (featuring Regine Velasquez) - used as the theme for the TV series of ABS-CBN, Be Careful with my Heart
"Constant Change" (1989)
"Is She Thinking About Me?" (featuring Christine Bersola-Babao)
"If We Only Had More Time Together"
"Easier Said Than Done"
"Love at Thirty Thousand Feet" (1976) - commercial jingle of the flag carrier of the Philippines, Philippine Airlines
"My Girl, My Woman, My Friend" (1988) - featuring Janet Basco
"Perhaps Love" - featuring Liza Chan
"So I'll Go"
"Here and Now"
"Emmanuel" (2001) - official anthem of the 15th World Youth Day in 2000.
"We're All Just One" (2005) - official anthem of the 2005 Southeast Asian Games
"Afraid for Love to Fade"
Counterpoint to Lennon & McCartney's "Here, There & Everywhere"
"Radio Romance" - station identification jingle of Radio Romance 101.9 (now MOR 101.9)
"Big Beautiful Country" - station identification jingle of the now-defunct television station Banahaw Broadcasting Corporation (BBC2) "now ABS-CBN 2 or now currently known as Kapamilya Channel & A2Z 11"
"Good Old Fashioned Romance"
"Part of Your Life"
"Mr. Songwriter"
"Sing Me Your Song Again, Daddy"
"No Rewind, No Replay"
"Thank You, Love" (2007)
"The Sound of Life"
"Empty Space" (2003) - original by the Bukas Palad Music Ministry
"Going to the Past"
"Christmas Past"
"Constantly" (2012)
"Pagdating Ng Pasko" (2013) - first Tagalog Christmas song

Collaborations
Gold Ito! (Dyna Music, 1988)
Ginintuang Diwa ng Pasko (Universal Records/WEA Records, 1989)
Maayong Pasko (Universal Records/WEA Records, 1989)
Jamie Rivera – Lord, Heal Our Land (Star Music, 2001)
Presence (Universal Records 2002)
Only Selfless Love 2 (Universal Records, 2003)
Something More (JesCom Music, 2004)
Best of OPM Love Songs (Universal Records, 2005)
Best of OPM Acoustic Hits (Universal Records, 2005)
OPM Gold Christmas (Universal Records, 2006)
OPM Superstars Christmas (Universal Records, 2006)
Sail On...His Most Holy Face (Universal Records, 2006)
OPM Platinum Christmas (Universal Records, 2007)
Isang Kinabukasan: A GMA Kapuso Foundation Benefit Album (GMA Music, 2007)
HOPE... Healing of Pain and Enlightenment (Star Music, 2007)
No. 1 Signature Hits OPM's Best (Vicor Music Corp., 2008)
Senti 18 Pinoy Love Hits (Vicor Music Corp., 2008)
Bongga! (The Biggest Retro OPM Hits) (Universal Records, 2008)
Bongga! 2 (The Biggest Retro OPM Hits) (Universal Records, 2009)
Paalam, Maraming Salamat Pres. Aquino (A Memorial Tribute Soundtrack) (Star Music, 2009)
RJ Duets (MCA Music, 2012)
A Love to Last (The Official Soundtrack) (Star Music, 2017)

Music videos
Christmas In Our Hearts (Original released in 1990, music video + karaoke video releases in 1991 featuring his real life daughter Liza Chan-Parpan; re-released music video exclusive by MYX Channel for MYX Live featuring Julie Ann San Jose as a new version in 2019, and a re-released as a music video with the Chan Clan in 2020)
A Perfect Christmas (Original released in 1990, music video releases in 1991; re-released music video exclusive by MYX Channel for MYX Live as a new version in 2019)
A Wish On Christmas Night (Original released in 1990, music video releases in 1991; re-released music video exclusive by MYX Channel for MYX Live as a new version in 2019)
Do You Hear What I Hear? (Original released in 1990)
Beautiful Girl (Original released in 1989, music video released in 1991)
Tell Me Your Name (Original released in 1985, music video released in 1991)
Christmas Past (Original released in 1994, music video released in 1995)
Constantly (2012, featuring his best friend guitarman RJ Jacinto)
Afterglow (2013, featuring his best friend guitarman RJ Jacinto)

See also
Levi Celerio

References

External links
Planet Philippines feature - Jose Mari Chan

1945 births
Living people
Ateneo de Manila University alumni
Filipino chief executives
Filipino expatriates in the United States
20th-century Filipino male singers
Filipino people of Chinese descent
Filipino Roman Catholics
Filipino OPM composers
Filipino singer-songwriters
Hiligaynon people
Manila sound musicians
People from Iloilo City
People from Iloilo
Singers from Iloilo
Universal Records (Philippines) artists
Vicor Music artists
Visayan people